50 Lions are an Australian hardcore band from Byron Bay, New South Wales. The band is named after a video poker machine of the same name.

History
In 2005, they released their self-titled 7-inch EP, which sold out within 3 months of its release. Later that year, they released their debut album, Nowhere to Run, through Washed Up Records.

In 2006 they did a tour with Australian band I Killed the Prom Queen.

They then released Time Is the Enemy through Resist Records in 2007.

At the beginning of 2008, the band played alongside Parkway Drive in 14 out of 15 dates during the Surf Rat Tour. They have since released a split CD with American band Down to Nothing.

After their European tour, they will be doing a tour of Australia with Blacklisted, and then will be a part of the annual Hardcore festival in Sydney. 50 Lions vocalist Oscar McCall is the brother of Parkway Drive vocalist Winston McCall.

Tours
Throughout their short career they have toured with bands such as Rise Against, Parkway Drive, I Killed the Prom Queen, Evergreen Terrace and Comeback Kid.

In November 2009, 50 Lions teamed up with Baltimore's Trapped Under Ice for a national tour of Australia. The tour will cover Adelaide, Melbourne, Canberra, Brisbane, Byron, Sydney and Perth. In January 2010, 50 Lions toured Australia nationally on the Boys of Summer 2010 Tour, supporting American metalcore band Every Time I Die. During the months from April to May 2010, 50 Lions toured Europe with Parkway Drive, Despised Icon, Winds of Plague and The Warriors.

Members
 Oscar McCall – vocals
 Byron "Boz" Carney – bass
 Elmzy – guitars
 Baina – guitars
 Jonathan Niclair – drums

Discography

Albums

Extended plays

Awards and nominations

AIR Awards
The Australian Independent Record Awards (commonly known informally as AIR Awards) is an annual awards night to recognise, promote and celebrate the success of Australia's Independent Music sector.

|-
| AIR Awards of 2010
|Where Life Expire 
| Best Independent Hard Rock/Punk Album
| 
|-

References

External links
 50 Lions Official slot

Australian hardcore punk groups
New South Wales musical groups
Musical groups established in 2005
Musical quintets
Byron Bay, New South Wales
Demons Run Amok Entertainment artists